9844 Otani, provisional designation , is a stony Eunomian asteroid from the middle region of the asteroid belt, approximately 4 kilometers in diameter. It was discovered on 23 November 1989, by Japanese astronomers Yoshio Kushida and Osamu Muramatsu at the Yatsugatake South Base Observatory, Hokuto, near the Greater Tokyo Area, Japan. It was named for Japanese astronomer Toyokazu Otani.

Orbit and classification 

Otani is a member of the Eunomia family, a large group of S-type asteroids and the most prominent family in the intermediate main-belt. It orbits the Sun in the central main-belt at a distance of 2.1–3.3 AU once every 4 years and 5 months (1,620 days). Its orbit has an eccentricity of 0.22 and an inclination of 13° with respect to the ecliptic. The first used observation was a precovery taken at Palomar Mountain in 1949, extending the body's observation arc by 40 years prior to its official discovery observation.

Physical characteristics 

A rotational lightcurve of Otani was obtained from photometric observations at the Palomar Transient Factory in February 2013. It gave a rotation period of  hours with a brightness variation of 0.18 in magnitude.

The Collaborative Asteroid Lightcurve Link assumes an albedo 0.21 – derived from 15 Eunomia, the family's largest member and namesake – and calculates a diameter of 3.84 kilometers with an absolute magnitude of 14.39.

Naming 

This minor planet was named in honor of Toyokazu Otani (born 1928), a renowned observer of minor planets, lecturer at the Gotoh Planetarium, and long-time employee at the Astronomical Museum in Tokyo (1956–1988). The official naming citation was published by the Minor Planet Center on 2 April 1999.

References

External links 
 Asteroid Lightcurve Database (LCDB), query form (info )
 Dictionary of Minor Planet Names, Google books
 Asteroids and comets rotation curves, CdR – Observatoire de Genève, Raoul Behrend
 Discovery Circumstances: Numbered Minor Planets (5001)-(10000) – Minor Planet Center
 
 

009844
Discoveries by Yoshio Kushida
Discoveries by Osamu Muramatsu
Named minor planets
19891123